United Nations Security Council resolution 1151, adopted unanimously on 30 January 1998, after recalling previous resolutions on Israel and Lebanon including 501 (1982), 508 (1982), 509 (1982) and 520 (1982) as well as studying the report by the Secretary-General on the United Nations Interim Force in Lebanon (UNIFIL) approved in 426 (1978), the Council decided to extend the mandate of UNIFIL for a further six months until 31 July 1998.

The Council then reemphasised the mandate of the Force and requested the Secretary-General to continue negotiations with the Government of Lebanon and other parties concerned with regards to the implementation of resolutions 425 (1978) and 426 (1978) and report thereon.

All violence against UNIFIL was condemned with the parties urged to put a stop to attacks on the Force. The Secretary-General Kofi Annan had reported that tension had increased in the region, with 34 casualties compared to 9 in the previous reporting period; it had also recorded 249 operations or attacks against the Israeli Defense Forces and South Lebanon Army. Further efficiency savings were encouraged provided they did not affect the operational capacity of the operation.

See also 
 List of United Nations Security Council Resolutions 1101 to 1200 (1997–1998)
 South Lebanon conflict (1985–2000)

References

External links
 
Text of the Resolution at undocs.org

 1151
 1151
 1151
South Lebanon conflict (1985–2000)
1998 in Israel
1998 in Lebanon
January 1998 events